The Nathan Warren House was a historic house at 50 Weston Street in Waltham, Massachusetts.  Built c. 1889-90 the -story house was one of the city's finest Queen Anne residences, with a turret and porte cochere, as well as a variety of decorated projecting sections.  The house was built by Nathan Warren, who wrote a history of Waltham, was active in local and state politics, and who was a member of an exploratory expedition to the Yellowstone area in 1873.

The house was listed on the National Register of Historic Places in 1990.  It was demolished in 2006.

See also
National Register of Historic Places listings in Waltham, Massachusetts

References

Houses in Waltham, Massachusetts
Houses on the National Register of Historic Places in Waltham, Massachusetts
Queen Anne architecture in Massachusetts
Houses completed in 1889
Demolished buildings and structures in Massachusetts
Buildings and structures demolished in 2006